Hexadecyl hexadecanoate, also known as Cetyl palmitate, is the ester derived from hexadecanoic acid and hexadecanol. This white waxy solid is the primary constituent of spermaceti, the once highly prized wax found in the skull of sperm whales. Cetyl palmitate is a component of some solid lipid nanoparticles.

Stony corals, which build the coral reefs, contain large amounts of cetyl palmitate wax in their tissues, which may function in part as an antifeedant.

References

Fatty acid esters
Palmitate esters
Waxes